The Electric Circus was a music venue in Collyhurst, Manchester, England, situated at the corner of Teignmouth Street and Collyhurst Street. It was an iconic and seminal venue for punk rock in 1970s Manchester.

History
The venue was originally the Palace Cinema, then the Top Hat Club run by Bernard Manning and then a bingo hall. It became a heavy metal club in the 1970s until punk arrived there in 1976, and Richard Boon and Alan Robinson started promoting nights there. However the building was in a poor state of repair and was closed in late 1977 due to objections from the fire service and Manchester City Council. It re-opened briefly again in 1978 as the New Electric Circus but by 1980 the building was demolished and replaced by housing.

Kevin Cummins described the venue as a khazi adding "everything was painted black so you couldn't see how shitty it was".

Music at the Electric Circus
The venue hosted a wide range of bands including:
The Adverts
Ed Banger & the Nosebleeds
Buzzcocks
Chelsea
John Cooper Clarke
The Clash
The Damned - played in January 1977
The Drones
The Fall
The Jam
The Negatives
Penetration
The Ramones - played first gig in Manchester here in 1977
Sex Pistols - played twice in December 1976, including 9 December 1976
Slaughter & the Dogs
Siouxsie and the Banshees
Steel Pulse
Talking Heads
Johnny Thunders and the Heartbreakers
Warsaw played for the first time on 29 May 1977 at the Electric Circus (despite being billed as The Stiff Kittens), supporting Buzzcocks, Penetration, John Cooper Clarke and Jon the Postman.
White Riot Tour played on 8 May 1977 featuring The Clash, The Slits, Buzzcocks and Subway Sect
The Worst

The last two nights of the Electric Circus (1 and 2 October 1977) were recorded and released by Virgin Records in January 1978 as a 10-inch compilation album Short Circuit: Live at the Electric Circus featuring The Fall, John Cooper Clarke, Warsaw, The Drones, Steel Pulse and Buzzcocks.

References

Sources 

Music venues in Manchester